The Embassy of Germany in Kyiv is Germany's diplomatic mission to Ukraine. The Federal Republic of Germany has since 1989 been officially represented in Ukraine, first by the Consulate General in Kyiv, since January 1992, after the Ukrainian independence in 1991, with a diplomatic mission. Since March 2000, an honorary consul in Lviv also represents the interests of the Federal Republic of Germany. In July 2008, another honorary consul was appointed in Odessa, followed by an additional consulate general in Donetsk since the summer of 2009.

Previous Ambassadors 
 Alfons Mumm von Schwarzenstein (1918)
 Johannes Graf von Berchem (1918-1919), Chargé d'Affaires
 Hennecke Graf von Bassewitz (1992–1993)
 Alexander Arnot (1993–1996)
 Eberhard Heyken (1996–2000)
 Dietmar Stüdemann (2000–2006)
 Reinhard Schäfers (2006–2008)
 Hans-Jürgen Heimsoeth (2008-2012)
 Christof Weil (2012-2016)
 Ernst Reichel (2016-2019)
 Anka Feldhusen (since 2019)

See also
 Germany-Ukraine relations
 Foreign relations of Germany
 Foreign relations of Ukraine
 Embassy of Ukraine, Berlin
 Diplomatic missions in Ukraine

References

 
 Régine Thirez: Barbarian Lens: Western Photographers of the Qianlong Emperor's. 1998.

External links 
 Embassy of Germany in Kyiv

Germany
Kyiv
Germany–Ukraine relations